Charles M. "Charlie" Kieffer (August 11, 1910 – November 8, 1975) was an American rower. He won the Olympic gold medal in crew at the 1932 Summer Olympics in Los Angeles. He was a graduate of La Salle University.

References 

1910 births
1975 deaths
Rowers at the 1932 Summer Olympics
Olympic gold medalists for the United States in rowing
American male rowers
Medalists at the 1932 Summer Olympics